The Spirit of Christmas 2007 is part of the Spirit of Christmas album series.

Track listing
"Silent Night" - Jimmy Barnes with Choir of Hard Knocks
"Island Christmas" - Christine Anu
"Happy Xmas (War Is Over)" - Borne
"The Coventry Carol" - Kate Miller-Heidke
"All I Want For Christmas Is You" - Guy Sebastian
"Joy To The World" - Amy Pearson
"Please Come Home for Christmas" - Shannon Noll & Natalie Bassingthwaighte
"Shine" - Kathleen de Leon Jones with Daniel Jones
"That's What Friends Are For" - David Campbell & Jolene Anderson
"I Still Can't Say Goodbye" - Troy Cassar-Daley
"I'd Like to Hitch a Ride With Santa Claus" - Deborah Conway & Willy Zygier
"Peace to All Men" - Anne Kirkpatrick
"Let It All Start Again" - Clare Bowditch
"Have Yourself A Merry Little Christmas" - Billy Thorpe & the Aztecs
"Yodelling Christmas" - Mary Schneider

See also
 2007 in music

2007 Christmas albums
Christmas albums by Australian artists
The Spirit of Christmas albums
2007 compilation albums